GP4, GP-4, GP.4, or variant, may refer to:
 Grand Prix 4, 2002 Formula 1 video game
 Osprey Aircraft GP-4, airplane
 González Gil-Pazó GP-4, airplane
 1989 GP4 or 7933 Magritte
 .gp4, TuxGuitar file format
 .gp4, Guitar Pro file format